The Honda G-series engine is a family of slanted inline-five cylinder gasoline engines. The engine family features a single overhead cam with 4 valves per cylinder. They were originally used in the 1989 Honda Vigor, Honda Rafaga, Honda Ascot and Honda Inspire. They then carried over to the Vigor's successor; the Acura TL, which ran from 1995-1998 in North America, and the Honda Saber in Japan.

G20A 

 Displacement: 
 Bore x Stroke: 
 Compression ratio: 9.7:1
 Max Power:  @ 6700 rpm
 Max Torque:  @ 4000 rpm
 Redline: 6800 rpm
 Fuel Cutoff: 7100 rpm

Found in the 1989-1991 JDM Inspire/Vigor (CB5), 1992-1994 JDM Inspire/Vigor 20 (CC3), 1993-1997 JDM Ascot/Rafaga 2.0 (CE4), and 1995-1997 JDM Inspire/Saber 20 (UA1).

G25A 

 Displacement: 
 Bore x Stroke: 
 Compression ratio: 10.0:1
 Max Power:  @ 6500 rpm
 Max Torque:  @3800 rpm
 Redline: 6800 rpm
 Fuel Cutoff: 7100 rpm

Found in the 1992-1994 JDM Inspire/Vigor 25 (CC2), 1993-1997 Ascot/Rafaga 2.5S (CE5), and 1995-1997 JDM Inspire/Saber 25 (UA2).

G25A1 

 Compression ratio: 9.0:1

Found in the 1992-1994 USDM & CDM Acura Vigor (CC2).

G25A4 

 Compression ratio: 9.6:1
Power: 

Found in the 1995-1998 USDM & CDM Acura 2.5TL (UA2).

Gallery

References 

 Official Honda Inspire site（Japanese）
 Fact Book G20A（Japanese）

G
Slanted engines
Straight-five engines
Gasoline engines by model